The Saloon Minneapolis is a gay bar located at 830 Hennepin Avenue (downtown Minneapolis). It is currently co-owned by John Moore and Jim Anderson. It is one of the oldest gay bars currently in operation in Minneapolis, founded in 1977. The Saloon is an important gay culture icon in the Twin Cities that is regularly featured in the popular press and oral histories. Local CBS affiliate WCCO rated it as one of the best gay bars in the Twin Cities.

The Saloon is also a performance venue. Vanessa Vanjie Mateo performed at the venue in 2018. Todrick Hall performed at the bar to kick-off the 2018 Twin Cities Pride festival.

References

External links 
 Club info : Saloon Minneapolis
 The Saloon on Facebook
 Throwback Thursday: Check out these ads for The Saloon from the early 1980s
 

LGBT culture in Minnesota
Buildings and structures in Minneapolis
LGBT drinking establishments in the United States